Steven O'Brien (born 28 December 1969) is an Irish Gaelic football manager and former player. In a career that spanned three decades he played at club level with Nemo Rangers and at inter-county level with the Cork senior football team.

Career

O'Brien first played for the Nemo Rangers club as a five-year-old, however, he first came to prominence as a schoolboy with Coláiste Chríost Rí with whom he won the Hogan Cup in 1987. That same year he made his senior debut with Nemo and went on to win three All-Ireland Club Championships over the following 15 seasons. O'Brien first appeared on the inter-county scene as a defender with the Cork minor team that lost successive All-Ireland finals. He later captained the Cork under-21 to the 1989 All-Ireland Under-21 Championship title. By this stage O'Brien had already joined the Cork senior football team and won the first of six Munster Championship titles in his debut season in 1988. He later added a National League to his collection before claiming successive All-Ireland medals in 1989 and 1990. O'Brien was also selected for Munster and was manager of the Nemo Rangers team that secured the 2015 Cork County Championship.

Honours

Player

Coláiste Chríost Rí
Hogan Cup: 1987
Corn Uí Mhuirí: 1987

Nemo Rangers
All-Ireland Senior Club Football Championship: 1989, 1994 (c), 2003
Munster Senior Club Football Championship: 1987, 1988, 1993 (c), 2000, 2001, 2002
Cork Senior Football Championship: 1987, 1988, 1993 (c), 2000, 2001, 2002
Cork Under-21 Football Championship: 1988, 1989

Cork
All-Ireland Senior Football Championship: 1989, 1990
Munster Senior Football Championship: 1988, 1989, 1990, 1993, 1994 (c), 1995
National Football League: 1988-89
All-Ireland Under-21 Football Championship: 1989 (c)
Munster Under-21 Football Championship: 1989 (c)
Munster Minor Football Championship: 1986, 1987

Manager

Nemo Rangers
Cork Senior Football Championship: 2015
Cork Under-21 Football Championship: 2012

References

1969 births
Living people
Nemo Rangers Gaelic footballers
Cork inter-county Gaelic footballers
Munster inter-provincial Gaelic footballers
Winners of two All-Ireland medals (Gaelic football)
Gaelic football managers